Stéphane Robert was the defending champion but lost in the quarterfinals to Maverick Banes.

Steven Diez won the title after defeating Banes 7–5, 6–1 in the final.

Seeds
All seeds receive a bye into the second round.

Draw

Finals

Top half

Section 1

Section 2

Bottom half

Section 3

Section 4

References
Main draw
Qualifying draw

2019 ATP Challenger Tour